The Geierwand is a mountain in the Dolomites in South Tyrol, Italy. The Geierwand crag provides a view onto lake Dürrensee and the Höhlensteintal. The yellow Dolomite limestone hosts athletic climbing routes up to 35 m high from 4a to 8c, and climbing is possible almost all year round, even in bad weather as the crag remains dry after extended periods of rain. Popular route during the Dolorock Climbing Festival.

References 

 Alpenverein South Tyrol 

Mountains of the Alps
Mountains of South Tyrol
Dolomites